Statistics of North American Soccer League in season 1973. This was the 6th season of the NASL.

Overview
Nine teams took part in the league with the Philadelphia Atoms winning the championship.

During the season, Tiburones Rojos de Veracruz from Vera Cruz, Mexico, played each of the nine NASL clubs in exhibition games that counted in the league's final standings.  The 1973 season would be the last season in which games from non-league clubs counted in league standings.

A week before the NASL Final 1973, commissioner Phil Woosnam announced that no team in the league made a profit during the season. 

In a unique twist, the team with home field for the NASL Championship Game determined the date and time the game was to be played.  When the Dallas Tornado won their semi-final, setting up the final with Philadelphia, they chose August 25 as the date of the game.  They did this because the NASL loan agreements with players from the English First Division (the precursor to today's Premier League) expired before that date.

Because of this, Philadelphia's two leading scorers, Andy "The Flea" Provan and Jim Fryatt, were on their way back to England when the championship match was played on the 25th.  Despite this, Philadelphia coach, Al Miller, put Bill Straub, a defender who had not played a minute for the club prior to the championship game, into the lineup at forward.  The move paid off as Straub headed home the second goal in a 2–0 win with under five minutes remaining in the final.

Changes from the previous season

New teams
Philadelphia Atoms

Teams folding
None

Teams moving
None

Name changes
Atlanta Chiefs to Atlanta Apollos
Miami Gatos to Miami Toros

Regular season
W = Wins, L = Losses, T= Ties, GF = Goals For, GA = Goals Against, BP = Bonus Points, PTS= Total Points

POINT SYSTEM 
6 points for a win, 3 points for a tie, 0 points for a loss, 1 bonus point for each goal scored up to three per game.
-Premiers (most points). -Other playoff teams.

NASL All-Stars

Playoffs
All playoff games in all rounds including the NASL Final were single game elimination match ups.

Bracket

Semifinals

NASL Final 1973 

1973 NASL Champions: Philadelphia Atoms

Post season awards
Most Valuable Player: Warren Archibald, Miami
Coach of the year: Al Miller, Philadelphia 
Rookie of the year: Kyle Rote, Jr., Dallas

References

External links
 Video highlights of NASL in 1973
Complete Results and Standings

 
North American Soccer League (1968–1984) seasons
1973
1973 in Canadian soccer